Jack King (6 September 1897 – 23 August 1983) was an Australian cyclist. He competed in two events at the 1920 Summer Olympics.

References

External links
 

1897 births
1983 deaths
Australian male cyclists
Olympic cyclists of Australia
Cyclists at the 1920 Summer Olympics
Place of birth missing